Ella Rae Peck is an American actress. She portrayed the roles of Charlotte "Lola" Rhodes in The CW series Gossip Girl and Mia Bowers in the NBC series Deception.

Life and career
Peck was born in Minneapolis, Minnesota, and went to school in New York City.

After a short film titled Lilly in the Woods in 2006, Peck appeared in the independent film Freezer Burn in 2007. The same year, she portrayed Honor Caldwell in the pilot Dear Harvard which is depicting Honor's life challenges during a sudden change in family social class status while attending a private all-girls school. For this role, she won the Best Actress Award at the New York Television Festival. She then landed guest roles in several TV series such as Without a Trace, Law & Order, The Good Wife and Blue Bloods between 2008 and 2010. She was also in the films God Don't Make the Laws and Young Adult in 2011.

In January 2012, she started appearing in the recurring role of Lola Rhodes, Serena van der Woodsen's cousin, in Gossip Girl, making a cameo in December in the series finale. In January, the film Bachelorette, in which she's Stefanie, was presented at the Sundance Film Festival and in March she landed the role of Mia Bowers in the 2013 NBC series Deception. On September 22, The Exhibitionists was presented at the Arizona Underground Film Festival.

On January 7, 2013 Deception made its debut on television and between January 17 and January 27 the short film The Apocalypse competed at the Sundance Film Festival. In early March 2013, she joined the cast of the NBC comedy pilot Welcome to the Family, which is picked up in May, while on March 15 the film The Call, with Halle Berry, was released.

Filmography

References

External links
 

21st-century American actresses
Actresses from Minneapolis
American child actresses
American film actresses
American television actresses
Living people
Year of birth missing (living people)